Darwin Cubs is a now-defunct soccer club from Darwin, Northern Territory, Australia.

The Cubs played as a foreign team in the Singapore Premier League in 1994 and finished runners-up to another Australian team, Perth Kangaroos IFC. The Cubs lost just three games for the season, two of those to the Kangaroos. The club also entered the Singapore league the following year, but had to withdraw mid-season due to financial difficulties.

The Cubs' nickname was derived from the club's sponsorship with Carlton & United Breweries, whose mascot at the time was a cub (due to the initials of the brand). When the Darwin side was provided with a number of shirts featuring a cub mascot, the nickname was born and the team decided to keep it.

The Cubs were managed by Frank Falzon. Some of the team's higher-profile players included Luis Rodriguez, Peter Politis, Manuel Lolias, Barbero, Hamilton Thorpe, Jason Petkovic, Cyrille Ndongo-Keller and Carlo Talladira, all of whom moved to or returned to Australian National Soccer League clubs after the demise of the Cubs.

References

Defunct soccer clubs in Australia
Foreign teams in Singapore football leagues
Soccer clubs in the Northern Territory
Association football clubs established in 1994
Association football clubs disestablished in 1995
1994 establishments in Australia
1995 disestablishments in Australia
Sport in Darwin, Northern Territory
Expatriated football clubs
Diaspora sports clubs